First Baptist Church of Guilford, is a historic Baptist Church located at 7504 Oakland Mills Road in the Guilford section of Columbia Maryland.

The church was founded in 1900 with its first building constructed in 1903.

See also
List of Howard County properties in the Maryland Historical Trust
Asbury Methodist Episcopal Church (Annapolis Junction, Maryland)
Brown Chapel United Methodist Church
Daisy United Methodist Church
First Baptist Church of Elkridge
Hopkins United Methodist Church
Locust United Methodist Church
Mt. Moriah Lodge No. 7
Mount Pisgah African Methodist Episcopal Church (Ellicott City, Maryland)
St. Stephens African Methodist Episcopal Church
West Liberty United Methodist Church

References

African-American history of Howard County, Maryland
Churches in Howard County, Maryland
Churches completed in 1903